The Chenggong fire belly newt (Cynops chenggongensis) is a species of newt of China. It is only known from its type locality, Shuitan in the Chenggong District of Yunnan.

References

Cynops
Amphibians of China
Endemic fauna of Yunnan
Amphibians described in 1983